The Republic of China ambassador in Managua is the official representative of the Government in Taipei to the Government of Nicaragua. There was a representative of the Government in Beijing to the Government of Nicaragua between 1985 and 1990 (see List of ambassadors of China to Nicaragua).

List of representatives

References 

Nicaragua
China